Fairfield Warde High School is a co-educational secondary school located in Fairfield, Connecticut, United States. The Fairfield Warde Mustangs play in the FCIAC division of the CIAC.

Notable people

 Jack Baran (2014), YouTuber
 Kristen Santos (2012), Olympic short track Speedskater
 Richard Belzer (1962), actor, author and stand-up comedian
 James Blake (1997), professional tennis player
 Thomas Blake (1994), professional tennis player
 Tatiana Foroud (1983), genetic researcher
 J. J. Henry (1993), professional golfer
 Eliot A. Jardines (1989), founder of the National Open Source Enterprise
 Linda Kozlowski (1976), actress
 John Mayer (1995), musician
 Matt Morgan (1995), professional wrestler
 David Pittu (1985), actor, writer and director
 Raviv "Ricky" Ullman (2004), actor

References

External links
 

Schools in Fairfield County, Connecticut
Buildings and structures in Fairfield, Connecticut
Public high schools in Connecticut
Educational institutions established in 1956
1956 establishments in Connecticut
Educational institutions established in 1986
1986 establishments in Connecticut
Educational institutions established in 2004
2004 establishments in Connecticut